One Hundred Thousand Dollars (Italian: Centomila dollari) is a 1940 Italian "white-telephones" comedy film directed by Mario Camerini and starring Assia Noris, Amedeo Nazzari and Lauro Gazzolo.

It was shot at the Palatino Studios in Rome. The film's sets were designed by the art director Fulvio Jacchia. It was part of the traditional of White Telephone comedies, popular during the era.

Synopsis
An American millionaire staying at a Budapest hotel falls in love with the telephone operator working there. When she refuses his advances because she already has a fiancée, he offers her a hundred thousand dollars to have dinner with him. Although she refuses, when her family find out the amount they pressure her to accept his offer.

Cast
 Assia Noris as Lily Zilay
 Amedeo Nazzari as Woods
 Lauro Gazzolo as 	Stefano Zilay
 Maurizio D'Ancora as Paolo
 Calisto Bertramo as Barton
 Ernesto Almirante as Michele Zilay
 Emilio Cigoli as Oldham 
 Arturo Bragaglia as Paul, il guardino aeroporto
 Liana Del Balzo as Miss Vernon 
 Velia Galvani as Elena Zilay 
 Gina Cinquini as Zita Zilay 
 Lina Tartara Minora as Maria Zilay
 Giulio Battiferri as Un radiotelegrafista 
 Ottavio Spina Borgianelli as 	Il borgomastro
 Ada Colangeli as Francesca, la moglie di Paul 
 Dhia Cristiani as Elsa, la telefonista
 Olinto Cristina as Il comandante dell'aeroporto di Budapest
 Arnaldo Firpo as Bartel, l'altro segretario
 Jucci Kellerman as L'altra Lily 
 Alfredo Menichelli as Un giornalista

References

Bibliography 
Gundle, Stephen. Mussolini's Dream Factory: Film Stardom in Fascist Italy. Berghahn Books, 2013.

External links 
 

1940 films
Italian comedy films
1940 comedy films
1940s Italian-language films
Films directed by Mario Camerini
Italian black-and-white films
Films shot at Palatino Studios
Italian films based on plays
Films set in Budapest
1940s Italian films